Antony Charles Robert Armstrong-Jones, 1st Earl of Snowdon,  (7 March 1930 – 13 January 2017), was a British photographer and filmmaker. He is best known for his portraits of world notables, many of them published in Vogue, Vanity Fair, and other major venues; more than 100 of his photographs are in the permanent collections of the National Portrait Gallery.

From 1960 to 1978 he was married to Princess Margaret, the sister of Queen Elizabeth II.

Early life 
Armstrong-Jones was the only son of the marriage of the Welsh barrister Ronald Armstrong-Jones (1899–1966) and his first wife, Anne Messel (later Countess of Rosse; 1902–1992). He was born at Eaton Terrace in Belgravia, central London. He was called "Tony" by his close relatives.

Armstrong-Jones's paternal grandfather was Sir Robert Armstrong-Jones, a Welsh psychiatrist. His paternal grandmother, Margaret Armstrong-Jones (née Roberts), was a graduate of Somerville College, Oxford, and was the daughter of Sir Owen Roberts, the Welsh educationalist. Armstrong-Jones's mother's family was of German-Jewish descent. A maternal uncle was the stage designer Oliver Messel (1904–1978); a maternal great-grandfather was the Punch cartoonist Linley Sambourne (1844–1910); and his great-great-uncle Alfred Messel was a Berlin architect. Additionally, his great-great-grandmother, Frances Linley, was a first cousin of Elizabeth Linley, wife of Richard Brinsley Sheridan.

Armstrong-Jones's parents divorced in early 1935, before his fifth birthday. His mother remarried later that year. As a schoolboy he contracted polio while on holiday at their country home in Wales. During the six months that he was in the Liverpool Royal Infirmary recuperating, his only family visits were from his sister Susan.

Education 
Armstrong-Jones was educated at two private boarding schools: first at Sandroyd School in Wiltshire from the autumn term of 1938 to 1943.

Armstrong-Jones attended Eton College, beginning in the autumn term ("Michaelmas half") of 1943. In March 1945, he qualified in the "extra special weight" class of the School Boxing Finals. He continued to box in 1946, gaining at least two flattering mentions in the Eton College Chronicle. In 1947, he was a coxswain in Eton's traditional "Fourth of June" Daylight Procession of Boats.

He then matriculated at the University of Cambridge, where he studied architecture at Jesus College but failed his second-year exams. He coxed the winning Cambridge boat in the 1950 Boat Race.

Career 

After university, Armstrong-Jones began a career as a photographer in fashion, design and theatre. His stepmother had a friend who knew Baron the photographer; Baron visited Armstrong-Jones in his London flat, which doubled as his work studio. Baron, impressed, agreed to bring on Armstrong-Jones as an apprentice, first on a fee-paying basis but eventually, as his talent and skills became apparent to Baron, as a salaried associate.

Much of his early commissions were theatrical portraits, often with recommendations from his uncle Oliver Messel, and "society" portraits highly favoured in Tatler, which, in addition to buying many of his photographs, gave him byline credit for the captions. He later became known for his royal studies, among which were the official portraits of Queen Elizabeth II and the Duke of Edinburgh during their 1957 tour of Canada. He was also an early contributor to Queen magazine, the magazine owned by his friend Jocelyn Stevens.

In the early 1960s, Snowdon became the artistic adviser of The Sunday Times Magazine, and by the 1970s had established himself as one of Britain's most respected photographers. Though his work included everything from fashion photography to documentary images of inner-city life and the mentally ill, he is best known for his portraits of world notables, many of them published in Vogue, Vanity Fair, and The Daily Telegraph magazine. His subjects include Marlene Dietrich; Laurence Olivier; Maggie Smith; Leslie Caron; Lynn Fontanne; David Bowie; Elizabeth Taylor; Rupert Everett; Anthony Blunt; David Hockney; Princess Grace of Monaco; Diana, Princess of Wales; Barbara Cartland; Raine Spencer (when she was Lady Lewisham); Desmond Guinness; British prime minister Harold Macmillan; Iris Murdoch; Tom Stoppard; Vladimir Nabokov and J. R. R. Tolkien. Over 100 of his photographs are in the permanent collections of the National Portrait Gallery in London.

In 1968, he made his first documentary film, Don't Count the Candles, for the US television network CBS, on the subject of aging. It won seven awards, including two Emmys. This was followed by Love of a Kind (1969), about the British and animals, Born to Be Small (1971) about people of restricted growth and Happy Being Happy (1973).

In October 1981, a group portrait by Snowdon of the British rock band Queen was used on the cover of their Greatest Hits album. A Snowdon portrait of Freddie Mercury was used in 2000 on the cover of Mercury's compilation box set The Solo Collection.

In 2000, Snowdon was given a retrospective exhibition at the National Portrait Gallery, Photographs by Snowdon: A Retrospective, which travelled to the Yale Center for British Art the following year. More than 180 of his photographs were displayed in an exhibition that honoured what the museums called "a rounded career with sharp edges".

Snowdon was an Honorary Fellow of the Royal Photographic Society—he was awarded the Hood Medal of the Society in 1978 and the Progress Medal in 1985.

In 2006, Tomas Maier, creative director of the Italian fashion brand Bottega Veneta, brought in Snowdon to photograph his Autumn/Winter 2006 campaign.

Designs and inventions 
Snowdon co-designed (in 1963, with Frank Newby and Cedric Price) the "Snowdon Aviary" of the London Zoo (which opened in 1964); he later said it was one of his creations of which he was most proud, and affectionately called it the "birdcage". He also had a major role in designing the physical arrangements for the 1969 investiture of his nephew Prince Charles as Prince of Wales.

He was granted a patent for a type of electric wheelchair in 1971.

Philanthropy and charity 
During his royal marriage, he was patron of the National Youth Theatre, the Contemporary Art Society for Wales, the Welsh Theatre Company, and the Civic Trust for Wales. He was also President of the British Theatre Museum.

In the 1960s he served as a council member of the Polio Research Fund, later renamed the National Fund for Research into Crippling Diseases. He served as a trustee of the National Fund for Research into Crippling Diseases, since renamed Action Medical Research.

In June 1980, Snowdon started an award scheme for disabled students. This scheme, administered by the Snowdon Trust, provides grants and scholarships for students with disabilities. He was president for England of the International Year of Disabled Persons in 1981. He was provost of the Royal College of Art from 1995 to 2003.

Publications 

Snowdon authored and curated a book of his own photographs, entitled Snowdon: A Life in View. It was edited by his daughter Lady Frances von Hofmannsthal. Graydon Carter wrote the foreword and Patrick Kinmonth wrote the introduction. Tom Ford is listed as a contributor in the book's credentials. It was published by Rizzoli in 2017. 

Generally, Snowdon's publications have been attributed to Antony Armstrong-Jones. Occasionally, the byline includes Earl of Snowdon, and most of the titles at least contain Snowdon in the title.

His other publications include:
 Assignments
 Snowdon: A Photographic Autobiography (Times Books, 1979)
 Snowdon Sittings
 Snowdon Stills (Olympic Marketing Corporation, 1987)
 Public Appearances 1987-1991: Snowdon
 Wild Flowers (with a foreword by Sir Roy Strong)
 Wild Fruit
 
 Snowdon on Stage: With A Personal View of the British Theatre 1954-1996
 Israel: A First View
 Pride of the Shires: The Story of the Whitbread Horses
 Serendipity by Snowdon (The Royal Pavilion, Art Gallery & Museums, 1989)

Personal life 
Snowdon was married twice, first to Princess Margaret (1960 to 1978) and secondly to Lucy Mary Lindsay-Hogg (1978 to 2000).

First marriage 

In February 1960, Snowdon, then known as Antony Armstrong-Jones, became engaged to the Queen's sister, Princess Margaret, and they married on 6 May 1960 at Westminster Abbey. The ceremony was the first royal wedding to be broadcast on television. Despite the enthusiasm of the public, some critics disapproved of a commoner marrying into the royal family. The couple made their home in apartments at Kensington Palace. He was created Earl of Snowdon and Viscount Linley, of Nymans in the County of Sussex, on 6 October 1961. The couple had two children: David, 2nd Earl of Snowdon, born 3 November 1961, and Lady Sarah, born 1 May 1964.

The marriage began to collapse early and publicly; various causes may have been behind the failure. On Margaret's end there was her penchant for late-night partying, while on Snowdon's part there was his undisguised sexual addiction ("'If it moves, he'll have it', was the summing-up of one close friend.") "'[T]o most of the girls who worked in the Pimlico Road studio, there seemed little doubt that Tony was gay'. To which Tony responds: 'I didn't fall in love with boys – but a few men have been in love with me.'" The authorised biography by Anne de Courcy (2008) reveals a series of affairs with women, including a 20-year relationship with his mistress Ann Hills, and that Armstrong-Jones did not deny that he was bisexual.

In his 2009 memoir, Redeeming Features, British interior designer Nicholas Haslam claimed that he had an affair with Snowdon before the latter's marriage to Princess Margaret and that Snowdon had also been the lover of Tom Parr, another leading interior designer.

The couple remained married for eighteen years. "They were both pretty strong-willed and accustomed to having their own way, so there were bound to be collisions", according to de Courcy. His work also consumed a great deal of time. "She expected her husband to be with her more, but one of Tony's strongest motivations was work." The marriage was accompanied by drugs, alcohol, and bizarre behaviour by both parties, such as his leaving lists of "things I hate about you" for the princess to find between the pages of books she read. According to biographer Sarah Bradford, one note read: "You look like a Jewish manicurist and I hate you". When high society palled for Snowdon, he would escape to a hideaway cottage with his lovers or on overseas photographic assignments. "Most people, including the Royal Family, took his side." Among Snowdon's lovers in the late 1960s was Lady Jacqueline Rufus-Isaacs, daughter of the 3rd Marquess of Reading. In spite of her own affairs, Margaret was said to be particularly upset when hearing about this woman. They separated in 1976, and the marriage ended in divorce in 1978.

In 2004, The Sunday Telegraph reported that Snowdon had fathered an illegitimate daughter shortly before marrying Princess Margaret. Anne de Courcy reported the claim by Polly Fry, born on 28 May 1960, in the third week of Lord Snowdon's marriage to Princess Margaret, and brought up as a daughter of Jeremy Fry, inventor and member of the Fry's chocolate family, and his first wife, Camilla, that she was in fact Snowdon's daughter. Polly Fry asserted that a DNA test in 2004 proved Snowdon's paternity. Jeremy Fry rejected her claim, and Snowdon denied having taken a DNA test. However, four years later, after Fry had died, Snowdon admitted that this account was true.

Second marriage 
After his divorce from Princess Margaret, Lord Snowdon married Lucy Mary Lindsay-Hogg (née Davies), the former wife of Sir Michael Edward Lindsay-Hogg, 5th Baronet, on 15 December 1978. Armstrong-Jones's youngest daughter, with Lucy Mary, is Lady Frances Armstrong-Jones, a designer and board member of the Snowdon Trust. She was born on 17 July 1979 and in 2006 married Rodolphe, Edler von Hofmannsthal, great-grandson of Hugo von Hofmannsthal and Charles Paget, 6th Marquess of Anglesey and great-great-grandson of Henry Manners, 8th Duke of Rutland. From 1976 until 1996, Snowdon also had a mistress, journalist Ann Hills. She died by suicide on 31 December 1996.

The couple separated in 2000 after the revelation that Snowdon, then aged 67, had fathered a son, Jasper William Oliver Cable-Alexander (born 30 April 1998), with Melanie Cable-Alexander, an editor at Country Life magazine.

Death 
Lord Snowdon died peacefully at his home in Kensington on 13 January 2017, aged 86.

His funeral took place on 20 January at St Baglan's Church in the remote village of Llanfaglan near Caernarfon. He was buried in the family plot in the churchyard.

Titles, honours and arms

Peerage 
Following his wedding, Armstrong-Jones was granted an earldom and introduced to the House of Lords as the Earl of Snowdon on 28 February 1962. The awarding of the earldom was in line with the practice of granting titles upon marriage into the royal family. Snowdon was appointed Constable of Caernarfon Castle in 1963; as part of this role, he assisted in organising the Investiture of the Prince of Wales in 1969.

He made his maiden speech in the House of Lords in April 1972 on the problems that disabled people suffered in everyday life. One of his last contributions to the Lords was in response to the Queen's Speech of 1992.

On 16 November 1999, Lord Snowdon was created Baron Armstrong-Jones, of Nymans in the County of West Sussex. This was a life peerage given to him so that he could keep his seat in the House of Lords after most hereditary peers had been excluded. An offer of a life peerage was made to all hereditary peers of the first creation (those for whom a peerage was originally created, as opposed to those who inherited a peerage from an ancestor) at that time. The government of the day had expected Lord Snowdon to follow the example of members of the royal family and turn down his right to a life peerage. At the time, Labour MP Fraser Kemp said he was "shocked and surprised that someone who achieved their position in the House of Lords by virtue of marriage should accept a seat in the reformed Lords".

Snowdon retired from the House of Lords on 31 March 2016 having seldom attended nor claimed any expenses for many years.

Awards and honours 
 GCVO: Knight Grand Cross of the Royal Victorian Order, 7 July 1969
 He was awarded the Royal Photographic Society's Progress Medal and an Honorary Fellowship in 1985.
 In 1989, he was awarded an Honorary Doctor of Laws (LL.D.) from the University of Bath.

Arms

Issue 
By Camilla Grinling Fry

By Princess Margaret

By Lucy Lindsay-Hogg

By Melanie Cable-Alexander

In popular culture
Armstrong Jones is portrayed in the Netflix series The Crown in season 2 by Matthew Goode and in season 3 by Ben Daniels.

See also 

 List of Cambridge University Boat Race crews
 List of Old Etonians born in the 20th century
 List of photographers
 List of University of Cambridge members

References

Publications 

 London. London: Weidenfeld & Nicolson, 1958. (A later edition has .)
 Assignments. London: Weidenfeld & Nicolson, 1972. .
 A View of Venice. [Ivrea]: Olivetti, c1972. 
 Personal View. London: Weidenfeld & Nicolson, 1979. .
 Snowdon Tasmania Essay. Hobart: Ronald Banks, 1981. . Text by Trevor Wilson.
 Sittings, 1979–1983. London: Weidenfeld & Nicolson, 1983. .
 Israel: A First View. London: Weidenfeld & Nicolson, 1986. .
 Stills 1984–1987. London: Weidenfeld & Nicolson, 1987. .
 Serendipity: A Light-hearted Look at People, Places and Things. Brighton: Royal Pavilion, Art Gallery & Museums, 1989. .
 Public Appearances 1987–1991. London: Weidenfeld & Nicolson, 1991. .
 Hong Kong: Portraits of Power. Boston: Little, Brown, 1995. . Text by Evelyn Huang and Lawrence Jeffery.
 Wild Flowers. London: Pavilion, 1995. .
 Snowdon on Stage: With a Personal View of the British Theatre 1954–1996. London: Pavilion, 1996. .
 Wild Fruit. London: Bloomsbury, 1997. . Text by Penny David.
 London: Sight Unseen. London: Weidenfeld & Nicolson, 1999. . Text by Gwyn Headley.
 Photographs by Snowdon: A Retrospective. London: National Portrait Gallery, 2000. .
 Snowdon. London: Chris Beetles Gallery, 2006. .

External links 

 
 

1930 births
2017 deaths
20th-century British photographers
Alumni of Jesus College, Cambridge
Antony
British portrait photographers
Cambridge University Boat Club rowers
Chartered designers
Crossbench life peers
Earls created by Elizabeth II
Earls of Snowdon
Emmy Award winners
English people of German-Jewish descent
English people of Welsh descent
Fashion photographers
Snowdon
Knights Grand Cross of the Royal Victorian Order
Life peers created by Elizabeth II
People educated at Eton College
People educated at Sandroyd School
People from Slaugham
People with polio
Photographers from London
Princess Margaret, Countess of Snowdon